Anku-Tsede (also Lt. Col E.K.D. Anku-Tsede) (born 12 February 1934) is a Ghanaian politician and an Educationist. He served as a member of parliament for the Ho west constituency in the Volta Region of Ghana, 7 January 1993 to 7 January 1997.

Early life and education 
Anku-Tsede was born on February 12, 1934. He attended Kumasi College of Technology where he obtained a Junior Staff Course Certificate.

Politics 
Anku-Tsede was first elected into parliament during the 1992 Ghanaian parliamentary election as member of the first parliament of the fourth republic of Ghana on the ticket of the National Democratic Congress. He was preceded by Samuel Yao Dzebu. He lost the seat to Francis Aggrey Agbotse of the National Democratic Congress who won the seat during the 1996 Ghanaian general election with 34,581 votes by defeating Victoria Yaa Boahene of the Convention People's Party (CPP) who obtained 1,284 votes and Seth Kofi Bonso of the People's National Convention (PNC) who obtained 291 votes.

On 30 June 1995, he talked about the drugs issues in the country and cautioned ''Otherwise, we will move up further to become an addicted country and finally arrive at the point of national disaster ''. It was in commemorate of International Drug Day

Career 
Anku-Tsede  is an Educationist. He was also the chairman of the Committee on Defense and Interior.

Personal life 
He is a Christian.

References 

Ghanaian MPs 1993–1997
National Democratic Congress (Ghana) politicians
Ghanaian Christians
People from Volta Region
Living people
1934 births